Trouxemil is a former civil parish in the municipality of Coimbra, Portugal. The population in 2011 was 2,712, in an area of 7.81 km2. On 28 January 2013 it merged with Torre de Vilela to form Trouxemil e Torre de Vilela.

References 

Former parishes of Coimbra